Trude Wollschläger (9 November 1912 – 10 July 1975) was a German swimmer. She competed in the women's 200 metre breaststroke at the 1936 Summer Olympics.

References

1912 births
1975 deaths
German female swimmers
Olympic swimmers of Germany
Swimmers at the 1936 Summer Olympics
Sportspeople from Duisburg
20th-century German women